I See a Dark Stranger – released as The Adventuress in the United States – is a 1946 British World War II spy film with touches of light comedy, by the team of Frank Launder and Sidney Gilliat, and starring Deborah Kerr and Trevor Howard.

As the film was made during the war the final section of the film "Peace" is clearly either an additional or alternative ending. Bridie herself, who is Irish and openly anti-British is willing to help the Germans at the outset and through most of the film.

Plot
In May 1944, during World War II, a young Irishwoman, Bridie Quilty, turns 21 and sets out to fulfil a lifelong dream born in listening to her late father's stories of the Irish Revolution. She leaves her rural village and goes to Dublin. On the way, she shares a train compartment with J. Miller, but believing him to be English, she is very brusque with him. On arrival, she seeks out Michael O'Callaghan, a famous ex-radical her father had supposedly fought alongside against the English in 1916. She asks him to help her join the Irish Republican Army. However, he has mellowed as the situation in Ireland has improved and tries to dissuade her.

Miller turns out to be a secret agent, assigned to break Nazi spy Oscar Pryce out of a British prison in Devon. When he runs into Bridie again, he recruits her. She gets a job at The George, a hotel and bar in nearby Wynbridge Vale, and becomes acquainted with a sergeant, who unwittingly provides her with information about the prisoner's impending transfer to London.

This is the opportunity that Miller has been waiting for. However, he is disturbed by the arrival of Lieutenant David Baynes, a British officer on leave. Since there is little to attract anyone to the town, he suspects the newcomer of being a counter-intelligence agent. He orders Bridie to distract Baynes on the day of the transfer.

Miller frees Pryce. Meanwhile Bridie goes on a date with Baynes to make sure he is out of the way. When she discovers Baynes is there to gather historical material for his thesis on Oliver Cromwell, whom Bridie hates for his conquest of Ireland, she dashes off, much to Baynes' confusion.

Shot fleeing from a roadblock, Pryce tells Miller he hid a notebook on the Isle of Man. Miller goes to Bridie's room and reveals that he too has been shot. He gives her the location to pass along. Unwilling to risk seeing a doctor, he tells her to dispose of his body after he is dead, which she does.

Bridie boards a train as instructed, but she witnesses her contact, an elderly woman, being arrested. Not knowing what to do, Bridie decides to return home. However, she encounters David, who followed her. Her plan to return to Ireland is foiled when a newspaper announces a ban on travel to that country.

She decides to retrieve the book herself. She is trailed by David and a German spy. Bridie figures out that the cryptic information gives the location of the imminent D-Day invasion, which could result in the death of thousands of soldiers, including Irishmen serving in the British armed forces, so she burns the book. David saves her from being arrested as Miller's confederate, and after telling Bridie that he loves her, she tells him what she has done.

Bridie tries to turn herself, but German agents kidnap her. When David tracks them down, he is abducted as well. When she refuses to tell what she knows, the couple are taken to Ireland. They hide in a funeral procession, but the "mourners" are actually smugglers trying to enter Northern Ireland. When an alarm clock hidden in the coffin goes off at the border crossing, the ensuing confusion enables the prisoners to escape. David telephones for the police from a pub, mistakenly believing that they are still in Ireland, where Bridie would merely be interned. When he realises that they are actually in Northern Ireland, and that Bridie could be shot as a spy, he tries to persuade her to flee across the nearby border, but she insists on staying with him. Then, they hear on the radio that D-Day has begun. Her information now useless, she escapes. David discovers the spies in a room upstairs and a fight breaks out. The police arrive and arrest all.

After the war, Bridie and David wed, but their marriage gets off to a rocky start when David books them in at The Cromwell Arms for their honeymoon night.

Cast

Deborah Kerr as Bridie Quilty
Trevor Howard as Lieutenant David Baynes
Raymond Huntley as J. Miller
Michael Howard as Hawkins
Norman Shelley as Man in Straw Hat, a German spy
Liam Redmond as Uncle Timothy
Brefni O'Rorke as Michael O'Callaghan
James Harcourt as Grandfather
George Woodbridge as Walter
Garry Marsh as Captain Goodhusband, an inept security officer on the Isle of Man
Tom Macaulay as Lieutenant Spanswick, Goodhusband's more astute subordinate
Olga Lindo as Mrs. Edwards
David Ward as Oscar Pryce
Harry Hutchinson as Chief Mourner/Smuggler
Harry Webster as Uncle Joe
 Joan Hickson as Hotel Manageress
 David Tomlinson as Intelligence Officer
 Torin Thatcher as Policeman
 Eddie Byrne as Irish Sailor Lookout

Cast notes:
Katie Johnson was a veteran of many Ealing Studios comedies. She is best known for her role in The Ladykillers.

Production
Frank Launder and Sidney Gilliat, who were the writers for Alfred Hitchcock's 1938 film The Lady Vanishes, formed Individual Pictures in 1945, with the intention of taking turns as director on the films they produced.  I See a Dark Stranger was the first of ten films released by the company.

I See a Dark Stranger was filmed at various locations, including Dublin, Dundalk and around Wexford in Ireland, Dunster in England and the Isle of Man.

During production, the rumour among crew members was that a close relationship had developed between the "handsome, young" cinematographer Wilkie Cooper and Deborah Kerr. If there was an affair, however, it was short-lived, as Kerr married Spitfire pilot Tony Bartley almost immediately after the film was in the can.

Reception
The film was released in the United States under the title The Adventuress, to good reviews but modest box office. Bosley Crowther, the critic for the New York Times said that the film was "keenly sensitive and shrewd."

In 1990 Sidney Gilliat thought the film "must have broken even now."

Awards and honours
Deborah Kerr won a 1947 New York Film Critics Circle Award for Best Actress for her performances in Black Narcissus and I See a Dark Stranger.

References
Notes

Bibliography
Vermilye, Jerry. The Great British Films. 1978, Citadel Press,  pp 94–96

External links
 
 
 
Film review at Variety
 I See a Dark Stranger at Screenonline

1946 films
British black-and-white films
British spy thriller films
1940s spy thriller films
Films directed by Frank Launder
Films set in Liverpool
Films set in Devon
Films set in Ireland
Films set on the Isle of Man
Operation Overlord films
World War II spy films
Films set in 1944
Films scored by William Alwyn
British World War II films
1940s English-language films
1940s British films